Sharon is passionate about sports, a leader in the community, TV sports personality and respected in corporate world.

Her athlete experienced representing Malaysia for 20 years as a national woman squash no.1 and no.18 in the world, motivates her to champion many youth and women empowerment initiatives.

Sharon is Vice President of Squash Racquets Association of Malaysia (SRAM), and been elected as ambassador in many organisations including Kementerian Belia dan Sukan (KBS) and Kementerian Pembangunan Wanita, Keluarga dan Masyarakat (KPWKM).

Recently she has been appointed by Olympic Council of Malaysia (OCM) as Deputy Chef De Mission of SEA Games 2023, Cambodia.

Career
Sharon is a multi talented sports person who is involved at competitive level in squash, badminton, tennis, netball and athletics.

Squash has become her professional sports career and has represented Malaysia for 20 years since she was 13 years old. Well-admired and respected national team captain.

As a professional squash player, she was based in Amsterdam, Netherlands and Antwerp, Belgium.

She toured all around the world to play in professional tournaments and leagues since 1997 and won numerous professionals titles. 10 years of participating in the World Women's Squash Championships, 5 gold medals in SEA Games (5 editions), a gold medal and 2 bronzes in Asian Games (3 editions) and 4 editions (1998, 2002, 2006, 2010) of Commonwealth Games.

Career after sports has brought her to be an international qualified coach, founder of Sharon Wee Squash Pro Academy, TV sports host and commentator, certified motivational speaker and an entrepreneur as a Director in Emerald Auto Parts Sdn. Bhd.
Sharon has hosted and commentated various sports and multi sports games including Olympic Games, Commonwealth Games, Asian Games, SEA Games, World Championships, British Open, All England, Thomas Cup and Sudirman Cup.

In SEA Games 2017 Kuala Lumpur, she was the Project Leader who trained and managed 1000 Official Chanters for Malaysian contingent.

She actively gives motivational, leadership and empowerment talk to sports community, school and university and corporate

Personal life
Born in Melaka and spent her childhood in Batu Berendam.

Education:

 Sekolah Kebangsaan Batu Berendam (Standard 1-6)
 Sekolah Menengah Kebangsaan Munshi Abdullah (Form 1-6)
 Universiti Putra Malaysia (Bachelor of Business Administration)

Sharon striked a great balance in education and sports.

She was also the Head Prefect and active in co-curriculum.

A great supporter of sports, community service and empowering women and youth (school & university) programs.

Awards
• Melaka Sportswomen of The Year

1994, 1995, 1999, 2001, 2002

• National Sports Award

Best Women’s Team - 1995, 2000, 2008, 2010

• OCM Women & Sport Award 2012

Grassroots Development Award

• SRAM Award 2012

Contribution to Malaysian Squash Award

References

External links 
 
 

1977 births
Living people
Malaysian female squash players
Peranakan people in Malaysia
Malaysian people of Chinese descent
People from Malacca
Squash players at the 2010 Commonwealth Games
Asian Games medalists in squash
Asian Games gold medalists for Malaysia
Asian Games bronze medalists for Malaysia
Squash players at the 2002 Asian Games
Squash players at the 2006 Asian Games
Squash players at the 2010 Asian Games
Medalists at the 2002 Asian Games
Medalists at the 2006 Asian Games
Medalists at the 2010 Asian Games
Southeast Asian Games medalists in squash
Southeast Asian Games gold medalists for Malaysia
Southeast Asian Games silver medalists for Malaysia
Competitors at the 2005 Southeast Asian Games
Commonwealth Games competitors for Malaysia